The My2K Tour is the third headlining tour by American boy band 98°. Starting summer 2016, the tour will play nearly 40 shows, predominantly featured in the United States. It is considered a "throwback" tour to create nostalgia for fans, with the tour title referencing the Y2K scare. Fellow boy band O-Town were initially thought to be co-headliners for the tour, but are only advertised as special guests.

Critical reception

Nicholas Friedman of The Dallas Morning News called the performance in Dallas "exactly what it should have been". He wrote: "And even though I didn't have any of their posters on my walls, 98 Degrees was a joy to watch, not only because of the nostalgia, but because it gave the crowd a real glimpse into the past".

Opening acts
Dream
Ryan Cabrera
Special guests
O-Town

Setlist
The following setlist was performed at the Hartman Arena in Park City, Kansas. It does not represent all concerts for the duration of the tour. 
"Heat It Up"
"Do You Wanna Dance"
"This Is How We Do It"
"The Way You Want Me To"
"Dizzy"
"Invisible Man"
"The Hardest Thing"
"Summer Girls" / "Fly" / "I Want It That Way" / "Wannabe" / "All the Small Things" / "...Baby One More Time" / "Bye Bye Bye"
"Impossible Things"
"Let's Go Crazy" / "1999"
"Microphone"
"My Everything"
"I Do (Cherish You)"
"Give Me Just One Night (Una Noche)"
"Because Of You"

Tour dates

Festivals and other miscellaneous performances
This concert was a part of the "Summer MixTape Festival"
This concert was a part of the "Six Flags Summer Concert Series"
This concert was a part of "Innsbrook After Hours"

Cancellations and rescheduled shows

Box office score data

External links
 Tour Twitter
 Tour Instagram
 98° Official Website

References

98 Degrees
2016 concert tours